The 2017–18 Danish Cup was the 64th season of the Danish Cup competition. Brøndby won the tournament, earning qualification into the third qualifying round of the 2018–19 UEFA Europa League.

Structure
In the first round, there will be 87 teams. 55 coming from the qualifiers among series teams in season 2016–17 with DBU Bornholm (1 team), DBU Funen (8 teams), DBU Jutland (20 teams) DBU Copenhagen (8 teams), DBU Lolland-Falster (3 teams) and DBU Zealand (15 teams). 22 teams from the 2016–17 2nd Divisions and 8 teams from the 2016–17 1st Division. The last two teams are the bottom two from the 2016–17 Superliga.

In the second round, there will be 52 teams. 43 of them are winners from the first round (plus one team who received a first-round bye) with 6 teams from the 2016–17 Superliga. The last teams are the top two from the 2016–17 1st Division.

In the third round, there will be 32 teams. 26 are winners from the second round. The last teams are the top six from the 2016–17 Superliga.

The remainder of the competition will be in a "knockout" format.

Participants
101 teams will compete for the Danish Cup. All teams from the top three divisions in 2016–17 are automatically entered while lower division teams play qualifying matches to enter the competition.

2017–18 Alka Superliga

2017–18 NordicBet Liga

2017–18 Danish 2nd Division

DBU Bornholm

DBU Funen

DBU Jutland

DBU Copenhagen

DBU Lolland-Falster

DBU Zealand

First round
In the tournament's first round, the teams are divided into a Western and Eastern pool. The Western Pool features 47 participating teams, divided into two pools, Funen/Jutland (22 teams) and Jutland (25 teams). The Eastern Pool consists of 40 teams divided into two pools, Zealand/Lolland/Falster (18 teams) and Copenhagen/Bornholm (22 teams).

The draw was held on Monday, 26 June 2017 with matches played between 8 August and 10 August 2017.

West, Jutland

Nørresundby BK received a bye in the first round.

West, Funen/Jutland

East, Copenhagen/Bornholm

East, Zealand/Lolland/Falster

Second round
For this round, the teams are divided into two equal groups, East and West. There were more West teams than East teams in the draw, so 5 Fynian teams were relocated to the East Pool – B1913, Dalum IF, OB, Næsby and Otterup.  The draw was held on Friday, August 11, 2017  and was organized so that clubs in the 2017–18 Superliga can not play each other.

West

East

Third round
In the third round, the top six teams from the 2016-17 Danish Superliga will enter the competition, joining the 26 winners from the second round matches.  The 32-team draw for the third round will also be organized so that clubs in the 2017–18 Superliga can not play each other.  Third Round matches will be played between September 19–21, 2017.

The draw was held on Monday, September 4, 2017.

Fourth round
The 16 winners from the third round will compete in matches to be played between October 24–26, 2017.

Bracket

Quarter-finals
Quarter-final matches were played between 4–12 April 2018.

Semi-finals
The two semifinal matches will be played between 24–26 April 2018.

Final

References

Danish Cup seasons
Danish
Cup